Pollok is a small settlement on the Āwhitu Peninsula in the Auckland Region of New Zealand. It is located to the north-west of Waiuku.

History

Pollok is a part of the rohe of Ngāti Te Ata Waiohua. The Crown purchased the land in 1861, and in 1865 the town was founded by Scottish immigrants from Pollokshaws near Glasgow, led by James Milne Smith, the reverend of the Pollokshaws United Original Secession Church. Smith tried to establish a self-contained and self-sufficient religious community at Pollok. In 1870, his church was joined by the Pollok Presbyterian Church.

Smith left the community in 1882, when the community's combined church and school was destroyed in a fire. After Smith's departure, the Auckland Education Board purchased a site next to the Pollok Presbyterian Church, and opened a school on 11 July 1883.

In the early 1910s, the first telephone exchange was constructed in the area in Pollok. This house was later moved to the historical precinct at the Waiuku Museum.

In 2005, the Pollok School was closed.

Education

Pollok School was established in the town in 1883. It operated for over 120 years as a primary school, until its closure in 2005.

References

Populated places in the Auckland Region